The Ducktrap River is a river in Waldo County, Maine.

See also
List of rivers of Maine

References

External links

Maine Streamflow Data from the USGS
Maine Watershed Data From Environmental Protection Agency

Penobscot Bay
Rivers of Waldo County, Maine
Rivers of Maine